La hija del mariachi (The Daughter of the Mariachi) is a Colombian telenovela produced by RCN Television and written by Mónica Aguledo. It debuted in 2006.

One night, ranchera singer Rosario Guerrero sees Emiliano at the doors of Plaza Garibaldi, a mariachi bar. He has an air of vulnerability and signs of having been robbed, so she decides to help him. What she does not know is that he is a wealthy young Mexican who has reached Bogotá fleeing from justice for a crime he did not commit.
 
The friendship they develop completely transforms their lives. He is astounded by Rosario’s selfless support, a rare commodity in the world of wealth he comes from. Thanks to her, he manages to survive as a mariachi singer in the bar while eluding the zealous pursuit of Interpol and the police in Colombia and Mexico. In this world, he discovers the widespread influence of mariachi music in Colombia. Above all, in Rosario he finds the great love of his life.
 
She also finds love thanks to Emiliano. With him, she begins to fit together the scattered pieces of her life. The happiest and yet most painful parts of Rosario’s life are related to the memory of her father. He was a mariachi singer, bohemian and passionate, and an affectionate man. Yet he filled his family’s life with sadness because he spent his nights with work, liquor, and women. In a desperate attempt to erase the memory of a turbulent childhood, Rosario is struggling to earn a degree in Business Management.
 
Despite the sadness, the image of her father is linked to joy and passion, so preserved as a relic of mariachi attire. A dress without a master, a pain that only fades when Rosario unwittingly falls in love with Emiliano and lends him the suit for him to sing in the bar Plaza Garibaldi.
 
Emiliano Sánchez-Gallardo, a member of one of the most powerful families in Mexico, never imagined he would end up as a singer in a Mexican music bar, middle class, in the Colombian capital. He believed that his legal status in Mexico would be cleared in a few weeks, so he never told Rosario the truth. But the trouble is serious: they are blaming him for a massive money laundering operation actually operated by his partners.
 

The uncertainty of trying to be someone else and the distress that it causes, causes the collapse of his family and his life, need to add the little control he has over his own feelings, to withstand the fierce opposition of their opponents, and the pitfalls put in his path by other women who desire Emiliano and want to separate him from Rosario.

Criticisms of the two versions 
The telenovela garnered a big audience in Colombia and Latin America. Given these facts, Colombia decided to record more chapters. Criticism of U.S. and Chilean versions have not been too positive, because the story is resolved in a fast manner, leaving some unfinished business. On the other hand, the Colombian version explained in more detail the resolution of the plot and keeps the spirit that took the soap during its course.

Cast
 
Mark Tacher…. Emiliano Sánchez  Carolina Ramírez — Rosario del Pilar Guerrero Santana de Sánchez-Gallardo
Nicolás Montero…. Javier Macías – Obsessively In love with RosarioGregorio Pernía…. Manuel Rodríguez (El Coloso de Jalisco) - Cares for Rosario, thought himself in love with herEstefanía Borges…. Virginia Malagón – Wants Francisco for herself / Hates Rosario and wants to take Francisco away from RosarioSilvia De Dios…. Nora de Macías (Macías' ex-wife)
Luís Eduardo Arango…. Sigifredo Santacruz (El Sentimental de Chapultepec)
Diana Ángel…. Leticia Agudelo
Luces Velásquez…. Eulalia de Malagón Mondragón
Silvio Ángel…. Don Genaro
Luisa Fernanda Giraldo…. Mireya
Morela Zuleta…. Aurora
Laura Torres.... Lucía Guerrero (Rosario's sister)
Antonio Sanint…Dr. Esteban Soto Is in love with VirginiaAlberto Valdiri…. Capitán Gregorio Bernal
Alpha Acosta…. Teniente Guadalupe Morales
Alfonso Ortiz…. Don Carlos Malagón
Mario Duarte…. Fernando Vladimir "El Mil Amores" Molina
Horacio Tavera…. "El Mañanitas"
Ariel Díaz…. Steve Anderson
Guillermo Murray…. Roberto Sánchez Gallardo
Paloma Woolrich…. Gabriela de Sánchez
Daniel Lugo…. Comandante Leonardo Salas
José Luís Franco…. Licenciado Miguel Corona
Luis Caballero…. Felipe Romero
Rodolfo Valdez…. Martín Del Valle
Tanya López…. Cristina Sánchez-Gallardo
Iván Darío López…. Lalo
Ana Rivera…. Laura
Fernando Peñuela.... Don Memo
Shirley Gómez.... Daniela
Esmeralda Pinzón.... Lourdes
Frank Beltrán.... Elías
Hansel Camacho.... José
Aida Morales.... Ángeles
Úrsula Prats…. Gabriela de Sánchez
Indhira Serrano…. Carmen Román
Jason Bawth Chad…. Andrew Scott
Andrés Hurtado…. Rodrigo 'Rorro' Román
Mauro Urquijo…. Pedro Guerrero – Rosario's fatherDaniela Barrios....Sarita (Best friend of Lucia)
Adriana Bottina....Voice The Rosario
Jairo del Valle....Voice The Francisco
Karen Garcia....?

Versions
There are two versions of this telenovela. Both share the script and actors, as well as the main plot. The difference is found between the version issued in Colombia and issued in Chile and the United States. Up to episode 118 both versions are identical. In Colombia, due to the success, decided to extend the story in twenty episodes.
 
The show was sold to other countries while still in the process of recording, with a number of episodes. To fulfill this contract, the producer made two final stories. The version issued in Chile and the U.S. has 124 episodes in the story resolved only six episodes from the aforementioned 118. However, in Colombia the story is much more delayed up to 146.
 
Remake
In 2012, Televisa produced Qué bonito amor'', a Mexican remake, written by the executive producer Salvador Mejía Alexandre. Jorge Salinas and Danna García are the main protagonists. Pablo Montero, Angélica María, and Arturo Peniche star as stellar performances. Roberto Palazuelos, Malillany Marin, Marcelo Buquet, and Salvador Pineda are the main antagonists.

References

Colombian telenovelas
2006 telenovelas
2006 Colombian television series debuts
2008 Colombian television series endings
RCN Televisión telenovelas
Spanish-language telenovelas
Television shows set in Colombia
Television shows set in Mexico